Tony O'Connor (born 1921 or 1922) was a Jamaican teacher. His 1967 appointment as a headteacher in Smethwick England—he was the first black person to hold such a post—caused a racist backlash.

Early life 

O'Connor was born in Jamaica in 1921 or 1922. He joined the RAF in 1943, during World War II, achieving the rank of flight sergeant and moving to the United Kingdom.

Career 

After the war, O'Connor took a teaching diploma at the University of Birmingham, then worked as a teacher, serving at two schools in Smethwick, including three years as deputy head at Albion School. He specialised in the Nuffield method of teaching mathematics, and trained other teachers in its use.

In September 1967, he was appointed head teacher at Bearwood Road Junior and Infants School in Smethwick, a town which had recently experienced racial tensions. He is widely held to have been the first black person to be a head teacher in the United Kingdom. He was reported as saying that he did not care if he was the "first, second, third or 250th West Indian headmaster".

Personal life 

At the time of his Bearwood appointment, O'Connor was living at Hall Green, Birmingham. His wife Marjorie was also a teacher. They had two daughters. Because of the racist threats directed at him, their daughters had to stay with relatives.

He retired in 1983.

Legacy 

A quote by O'Connor featured in a calligraphic artwork by the artist Linett Kamala, which was included in her 2018-2019 "Excellence – A Celebration of Pioneering Headteachers" exhibition at the University of Roehampton, commemorating black head teachers.

Among O'Connor's pupils at Smethwick was Doreen Foster, subsequently director of Warwick Arts Centre.

Papers relating to O'Connor's headmastership are held by Sandwell Archives.

Notes

References 

Possibly living people
1920s births
Year of birth uncertain
Heads of schools in England
Migrants from British Jamaica to the United Kingdom
Royal Air Force personnel of World War II
Alumni of the University of Birmingham
Schoolteachers from the West Midlands
Royal Air Force airmen
Black British military personnel